The gunta or guntha is a South Asian measure of area. This unit is typically used to measure the size of a piece of land.

In India
 1 anna = 7.5624 square yards = 6.3232 square metres
 1 gunta = 120.999 square yards = 101.1714 square metres = 16 annas
 1 guntha (R) =  ×  = 
 40 gunthas = 1.0 acre
 4 acre = 1 fg

In Pakistan
Other units were used alongside Imperial measures

 1 anna = 20.16 sq yd
 6 anna = 1 guntha = 120 square yard
 4 guntha = 1 jareeb = 484 square yard
 4 jareeb = 1 kanee = 1936 square yard
 10 jareeb = 1 acre = 4840 square yard
 25 acres = 1 marabba

See also
 Conversion of units
 Acre-foot
 Acre
 Acre (Scots)
 Hectare

References

Units of area
Customary units in India